

History
Irish Squash experienced a resurgence in popularity in the 2000s, following a dip in its profile during the 1990s. Belfast hosted the Women's International Squash Players Association World Championship in November 2006 with the final being played at the Ulster Hall.

The Irish senior ladies team have performed well at the WSF World Team Squash Championships, winning bronze in 1985 and finishing 5th in 2008. They also finished in 4th position at the European Team Championships in France.

Clubs

Governance
Irish Squash, the national governing body for squash in Ireland, celebrated its 75th anniversary in 2010. Below the national body are four provincial organisations.

Notable players
Irish Squash includes notable players such as Jonah Barrington, Derek Ryan, Madeline Perry, Liam Kenny Aisling Blake and John Rooney. Jonah Barrington was honoured with a lifetime achievement award in 2006 at the World Squash Awards. Barrington played for Trinity and returned to compete against the Trinity team in 1992.

Competitions
The Irish Open is usually held at the Fitzwilliam Lawn Tennis Club.

Irish Men's Open Results 

Jonah Barrington won the Irish Open in 1966, 1967, 1969, and 1979, and was runner-up (to his rival, Geoff Hunt) in 1972. In 1976, Geoff Hunt beat Mohibullah Khan in the (then) new Squash Ireland Centre in Dublin. Earlier, from the mid-1950s onwards Donald Pratt, an all-round sportsman who also excelled at cricket, won the Irish Open for ten years in succession.

In 2005 the Pakistani squash team were unable to play in the Irish Open due to their visas for Ireland not being granted in time following qualification.

Irish Women's Open Results 

2003 marked the first Women's Irish Open since 1991, where Cassie Jackman - the 2003 losing finalist - reached the semi-finals.

References

External links
Official Irish Squash web site
Official site for the sport in Leinster
Official site for the sport in Ulster
Official site for the sport in Munster

 
Sport in Ireland by sport